The 2014 Women's Four Nations Hockey Tournament was a women's field hockey tournament, consisting of a series of test matches. It was held in Dublin, Ireland, from July 12 to 16, 2014, and featured four of the top nations in women's field hockey.

Competition format
The tournament featured the national teams of Canada, Chile, New Zealand, and the hosts, Ireland, competing in a round-robin format, with each team playing each other once. Three points will be awarded for a win, one for a draw, and none for a loss.

Officials
The following umpires were appointed by the International Hockey Federation to officiate the tournament:

 Fanneke Alkemade (NED)
 Joanne Cumming (NZL)
 Alison Keogh (IRE)
 Megan Robertson (SCO)
 Sarah Wilson (CAN)

Results
All times are local (Irish Standard Time).

Preliminary round

Fixtures

Classification round

Third and fourth place

Final

Statistics

Final standings

Goalscorers

References

External links
Official Website

2014 in women's field hockey
field hockey
field hockey